Uttaradhyayana or Uttaradhyayana Sutra is one of the most important sacred books of the Svetambara Jains. It consists of 36 chapters, each of which deals with aspects of Jain doctrine and discipline. It is believed by some to contain the actual words of Bhagwan Mahavira (599/540 - 527/468 BCE).

See also 
 List of Jain texts

References

Citations

Sources

External links
 Jacobi, Hermann (trans., 1895), ''Jaina Sutras, Part II: The Uttarâdhyayana Sûtra; The Sûtrakritâṅga Sûtra. (Oxford: The Clarendon Press).  Available at https://www.sacred-texts.com/jai/sbe45/index.htm .

Jain texts